Kalaamaya, also spelled Karlamay, is a Pama–Nyungan language of Western Australia. It is poorly attested, but appears to be a close relative of the Nyungar languages.

A variety called Nyaki Nyaki (Njakinjaki) has been variously said to be a dialect of Nyungar or of Kalaamaya. Natingero has also been listed as a dialect, but it is only 40% lexically similar.

A single fluent speaker, Kaprun elder Brian Champion who learned the language as an adult, and several partial speakers remain.

See also
Mirning languages

References

Nyungic languages